Union Grange Hall is an historic wooden Grange hall located in the village of Slatersville in the town of North Smithfield, Rhode Island. A contributing property in the Slatersville Historic District, it was built in 1897 as St. Luke's Episcopal Mission and in 1920, it became Union Grange Hall. It is not currently being used.

References

Churches completed in 1897
Grange organizations and buildings
Grange buildings on the National Register of Historic Places
Buildings and structures in Providence County, Rhode Island
Episcopal churches in Rhode Island
Clubhouses in Rhode Island
Historic district contributing properties in Rhode Island
19th-century Episcopal church buildings
National Register of Historic Places in Providence County, Rhode Island
Clubhouses on the National Register of Historic Places in Rhode Island